De eneste to is the debut album from the Danish pop duo De Eneste To. It was released on 11 October 2010. The first single released was "Morten", on 16 August 2010. On 22 October 2010, the album appeared at number one on Tracklisten, the Danish Albums Chart. In late January 2011, the album was certified platinum.

Track listing

References

2010 debut albums
De Eneste To albums